Frederick Thorvald Hansen (3 May 1847 - 24 January 1915) was a Danish trumpeter and composer. As a boy, he learned to play the piano, organ, violin, and later trumpet: with Peter Johan Waldemar Petersen, Danish trumpeter (1824-1901)². In 1867, Hansen joined the Tivoli Concert hall Orchestra and in 1884 he was hired as a solo trumpeter in the Royal Danish Orchestra. At the same time, he played viola and violin in various chamber ensembles. Hansen was for many years organist substitute for cathedral organist J. P. E. Hartmann in the Church of Our Lady. He also composed and has written a number of smaller pieces for piano and trumpet, but also other things such some Progressive End Exercises for Trumpet in F. In 1893 he joined the Royal Danish Academy of Music to teach trumpet there.

Compositions 
 Sonata for cornet and piano in E Flat Major, op. 18 (1915)
 Cantata for the Naval School 200 Annual Fest (1901)
 Vaisenhus-Cantata (1902)
 Quartet for 2 cornets and trombones 2 (1904)
 Suite for orchestra
 Chanson du soir for string orchestra and harp
 Romance with string orchestra and 2 horns
 Serenade for oboe
 Serenade for French horn
 Concert Waltz for Cornet and piano
 Romance for Cornet and piano
 Scherzo for viola and piano
 Concert Wire
 "From Gyldenløve" for voice and piano

1847 births
1915 deaths
Danish trumpeters
Danish composers
Male composers
Academic staff of the Royal Danish Academy of Music

² East meets West - The Russian trumpet tradition from the Time of Peter the Great to the October Revolution, E. Tarr, HBS series n° 4, Pendragon Press,2003, G.G.